The 1972 TAA Formula Ford Driver to Europe Series was an Australian motor racing competition open to Formula Ford racing cars.
It was the third annual Australian national series for Formula Fords.

The series was won by Bob Skelton driving a Bowin P4a.

Schedule
The series was contested over eight rounds.

Points system
Series points were awarded on a 10-9-8-76-5-4-3-2-1 basis for the first ten positions in each round.

Only the best three scores in Victorian races and the best three scores in New South Wales races were considered for each driver.

Series standings

References

TAA Formula Ford Driver to Europe Series
Australian Formula Ford Series